Weller Hauraki (born 18 February 1985) is a New Zealand former professional rugby league footballer who played as a  or  and played for the New Zealand Māori at international level.

He has played for the Parramatta Eels in the NRL, and Crusaders RL, Leeds Rhinos, Castleford Tigers (Heritage № 936), Hull Kingston Rovers and the Salford Red Devils in the Super League, spending time on loan from Salford at the Widnes Vikings in 2018.

Background
Hauraki was born in Dannevirke, New Zealand.

Early career

Manawatu (2002)

2002
Hauraki played for Manawatu in the 2002 North Island Super 6 competition.

Senior career

Parramatta Eels (2007-09)

2007-09
Hauraki began his career in the National Rugby League playing for the Parramatta Eels, he made his début against the New Zealand Warriors during the 2007 season, and he went on to make 32 appearances over three seasons. Hauraki also won the 2007 Intrust Super Premiership NSW competition with Parramatta, scoring a try right on the final siren to defeat the North Sydney Bears, 20-15.
His most memorable game for the Eels came in round 6 of the 2009 season, when he scored two tries against the Canterbury-Bankstown Bulldogs, after replacing his injured teammate Nathan Hindmarsh.

Crusaders RL (2010)

2010
In 2010, to ease pressure on the Parramatta Eels' salary cap, Hauraki was released and went on to sign a two-year contract with the Crusaders RL club in the Super League.

He made his début for the Crusaders against the Wigan Warriors on 5 February 2010, at the DW Stadium.

Leeds Rhinos (2011–12)

2011
After his very impressive first season in the Super League, Hauraki signed a three-year contract to play for the Leeds Rhinos.

He made his début from off the interchange bench against Hull F.C. and he scored in the Rhinos' 32-18 victory.

Castleford Tigers (2013–14)

2013
Hauraki then joined the Castleford Tigers ahead of the 2013 season.

Weller quickly established himself in what surprisingly became one of the Super League's most feared packs, helping the Castleford Tigers cement their highest-ever Super League finish of 4th.

2014
He was also instrumental in a run to the 2014 Challenge Cup Final defeat by the Leeds Rhinos at Wembley Stadium, with that ending in a 23-10 defeat by his former club and rivals the Leeds Rhinos.

Salford Red Devils (2015–18)

2015-18
Hauraki represented the Salford Red Devils for four consecutive seasons, recording 73 appearances and scoring 14 tries for the club in total.

Widnes Vikings (2018)

2018
During the 2018 season, Hauraki was sent out on loan from the Salford Red Devils to the struggling Widnes Vikings, where he subsequently suffered relegation from the Super League with the Vikings at the end of the campaign.

Hull Kingston Rovers (2019–2020)

2019
It was revealed on 3 October 2018, that Hauraki had committed to a two-year deal to join Hull Kingston Rovers ahead of the 2019 Super League season.

Weller scored his first try for the Hull Kingston Rovers on 23 February 2019, in a 22-24 Super League round 4 defeat by the Salford Red Devils.

2020
Hauraki was released by Hull KR at the end of the 2020 season.

2021
On 9 Feb 2021 it was reported that Weller had decided to retire.

Representative career (2005–10)
Hauraki was named in the New Zealand training squad for the 2008 Rugby League World Cup, but did not make the final squad.

However, Hauraki did play for the New Zealand Māori in their 34-26 defeat by the Indigenous All Stars before the start of the 2008 Rugby League World Cup, having previously represented the side in 2005.

Hauraki again played for the New Zealand Māori in 2010, in the 18-18 draw against England.

References

External links

Hull KR profile
Salford Red Devils profile
Cruasders profile
Parramatta Eels profile
NRL profile
SL profile
Weller Hauraki release first step in cap cleanout

1985 births
Living people
Castleford Tigers players
Crusaders Rugby League players
Hull Kingston Rovers captains
Hull Kingston Rovers players
Leeds Rhinos players
Manawatu rugby league team players
New Zealand rugby league players
New Zealand Māori rugby league players
New Zealand Māori rugby league team players
New Zealand expatriate sportspeople in England
Parramatta Eels players
Rugby league players from Dannevirke
Rugby league second-rows
Salford Red Devils players
Wentworthville Magpies players
Widnes Vikings players